The Gehn is a small ridge of hills between Bramsche and Ueffeln in Germany's Central Uplands, that are an extension of the Wiehen Hills.
The Gehn forms a link between the Wiehen Hills and the Ankum Heights (Ankumer Höhe). It is largely forested and is not - like the Ankum Heights- part of a series of ice age terminal moraines from the latest event of the Saalian glaciation, the so-called Drenthe I stage, but is a ridge of Jurassic rock that was pushed up during the folding towards the end of the Cretaceous period.

Like the Wiehen Hills and the Ankum Heights, the Gehn belongs to the North Teutoburg Forest-Wiehen Hills Nature Park (Naturpark Nördlicher Teutoburger Wald-Wiehengebirge).

Elevations 
Amongst the main elevations on the Gehn are the:
 Kettelsberg
 Gehnberg (108.1 m)
 Heseper Berg (107.9 m)
 Frettberg (105.9 m)

External links 
F. Bailly, P. Felix-Henningsen, H. Klassen, S. Stephan: Synsedimentäre Paläo-Vertisole im Oberjura des westlichen Wiehengebirges

Ridges of Lower Saxony
Natural regions of the Lower Weser Uplands